John Cooper (1793–1870), was a British actor active between 1811 and 1859, who played in "a singularly large number of parts, some of them of leading importance" in many locations in England, Wales and Scotland.

Career

Early years

Cooper was born in Bath in 1793, the son of a tradesman. His first recorded role was as "Alonzo" in E. Young's The Revenge, in a private theatre. He first appeared on the Bath stage on 14 March 1811, aged 18. His first appearance in London was at the Haymarket, on 15 May 1811, as "Count Montalban" in John Tobin's The Honeymoon. He subsequently joined Andrew Cherry and played in a number of Welsh theatres, and in 1812 he played in the north of England and in Scotland. In Edinburgh he played "Edgar" to Edmund Kean's King Lear, and in Glasgow was the first to play the title role in Sheridan Knowles' Virginius.

Drury Lane

He made his first appearance at Drury Lane in November 1820, as "Romeo", and "was well received". Subsequent roles at Drury Lane included: "Antony" in Julius Caesar, "Tullus Aufidius" in Coriolanus, "Joseph" in The School for Scandal, "Richmond" in Richard III, and "Iago" in Othello.

London
Around 1825 he married the widowed actress Mrs Dalton, originally Miss Walton, of Dublin, and over the next couple of decades played a large number and variety of parts at Covent Garden, the Haymarket, the English Opera House, and the Surrey.

The Midlands
Cooper was also popular and in demand on the York and Lincoln circuits. When his wife died in London in 1843, he moved to Norwich where he was appointed stage-manager. In 1845 moved to Newmarket, and was subsequently engaged by Knowles, the proprietor of the Theatre Royal, Manchester. He made his début there as "Menenius" in Coriolanus. Cooper was also popular in Hull and Leeds.

London

His final roles were played under Charles Kean at the Princess's Theatre, London, where his performances included "Henry IV" in Henry IV, Part I, the "Duke of York" in Richard II, and "Kent" in King Lear.

Retirement

He retired in 1859, withdrew from the stage, and lived on his savings in Ealing. He subsequently moved to Tunbridge Wells for his health, and died there on 13 July 1870.

References

1793 births
1870 deaths
19th-century English male actors